Y class or class Y may refer to:

Locomotive classes
South Australian Railways Y class, a steam locomotive class built in South Australia
Victorian Railways Y class, an example of the new policy of standard design principles being adopted by the railways
GNoSR Classes X and Y, two similar classes of 0-4-2T steam locomotives
NCC Class Y, a class of 0-6-0T steam locomotive
NER Class Y, a 4-6-2T steam locomotive
SNCF Class Y 7100, a class of small diesel shunters
SNCF Class Y 7400, a class of small diesel shunters
SNCF Class Y 8000, a class of diesel shunter built between 1977 and 1990
SNCF Class Y 8400, a class of small diesel shunters
SNCF Class Y 9000, the new designation for modernized and re-engined Y7100 and Y7400 shunters
Tasmanian Government Railways Y class, a type of Bo-Bo diesel electric locomotive
Victorian Railways Y class (diesel), a small branch line and shunting unit
WAGR Y class, a diesel electric locomotive introduced in 1953

Other uses
 Y-class lifeboat, a class of small inflatable boat operated by the RNLI of the United Kingdom and Ireland
 Spectral class Y, spectral classification of a brown dwarf substellar object
 Economy class (travel class code used by airlines: "Y")
 Class Y, a capacitor type

See also
 Y (disambiguation)
 Model Y (disambiguation)